The 2018 Elite One is the 58th season of the Cameroon top-tier football league. The season began on 11 February and ended on 29 July 2018.

Final table

References

Elite One seasons
football
Cameroon